Trudis Liit (International title: Little Trudis / ) is a 2010 Philippine television drama comedy series broadcast by GMA Network. Based on a 1963 Philippine film of the same title, the series is the twenty-first and final instalment of Sine Novela. Directed by Don Michael Perez, it stars Jillian Ward in the title role. It premiered on June 21, 2010 on the network's Dramarama sa Hapon line up replacing Gumapang Ka sa Lusak. The series concluded on October 22, 2010 with a total of 90 episodes. It was replaced by Little Star in its timeslot.

Cast and characters
Lead cast
 Jillian Ward as Gertrudis "Trudis" Capili-Ferrer

Supporting cast
Gina Alajar as Lolita "Lolly" Toledo-Ferrer
Ian Veneracion as Bogart Perez
Cris Villanueva as Niccolo "Nick" Ferrer
Pauleen Luna as Honelyn "Honey" Toledo-Ferrer
Mike Tan as Miguelito "Migs" Ocampo
Maxene Magalona as Mercedes "Ched" Cristobal
Bella Flores as Donya Hershey Ferrer
Jao Mapa as Catalino "Lino" Capili
Maricel Morales as Magdalena "Magda" Basco-Capili
Dexter Doria as Carmen "Menang" Cristobal
Archie Adamos as Carlos "Carling" Cristobal
Francheska Salcedo as Sugar Toledo
Jamaica Mikaella Olivera as Guadalupe "Upeng" Capili
Marc Acueza as Alvin
Robert Ortega as Bogart
Yul Servo as Lando
Chynna Ortaleza as Precious Toledo
Russianne Jandris Ilao
Jhiz Deocareza

Ratings
According to AGB Nielsen Philippines' Mega Manila People/Individual television ratings, the pilot episode of Trudis Liit earned a 6.3% rating. While the final episode scored an 8% rating.

Accolades

References

External links
 

2010 Philippine television series debuts
2010 Philippine television series endings
Filipino-language television shows
GMA Network drama series
Live action television shows based on films
Television shows based on comics
Television shows set in the Philippines